Nichola McAuliffe (born 1955) is an English television and stage actress and writer, best known for her role as Sheila Sabatini in the ITV hospital sitcom Surgical Spirit (1989–1995). She has also starred in several stage musicals and won the 1988 Olivier Award for Best Actress in a Musical for her role in Kiss Me, Kate.

Acting career
McAuliffe was born in 1955 in Cobham, Surrey, England, and trained at the London Academy of Music and Dramatic Art.

In 1984 she won the Clarence Derwent Award for her role as Queen Victoria in the West End production of Poppy at the Adelphi Theatre.

Between 1989 and 1995, she starred as obstreperous surgeon Sheila Sabatini in the ITV sitcom Surgical Spirit, her most high-profile acting role to date. She also appeared in the long-running soap opera Coronation Street between 2001 and 2002. Other TV roles were in "The Sound of Drums", a Doctor Who episode screened on 23 June 2007, and in My Family as the judge in episode "Life Begins at Fifty".

In 1999 she played Jocasta, alongside Michael Sheen in the title role, in a Naxos Records audio recording of Sophocles' Oedipus the King.

She has also had a number of stage roles, and was awarded the Laurence Olivier Theatre Award in 1988 (1987 season) for "Best Actress in a Musical" for Kiss Me, Kate. She also appeared as the evil Baroness Bomburst in the West End production of Chitty Chitty Bang Bang at the London Palladium, and was nominated for a 2003 Laurence Olivier Theatre Award for Best Performance in a Supporting Role or Musical of 2002 for her performance in the production.

In 2009 she appeared as the Wicked Fairy at the Yvonne Arnaud Theatre, Guildford, in Sleeping Beauty alongside Sarah-Jane Honeywell and Shane Lynch. In 2011 she played Miss Shepherd in The Lady in the Van at Hull Truck Theatre.
 
In 2012, McAuliffe, a winner in 2001 for her performance in A Bed Among the Lentils was again named best actress (the only person to win the nomination twice) in the Stage Awards for Acting Excellence at the Edinburgh Festival Fringe. She subsequently wrote and appeared in a comic play, Maurice's Jubilee, staged at The Pleasance, which tells the story of an elderly man at the end of his life who is preparing to celebrate the Queen's Diamond Jubilee.

In film, McAuliffe provided the voice of James Bond's BMW in the 1997 film Tomorrow Never Dies. In 2009 she appeared in Chéri with Michelle Pfeiffer.

In 2014, McAuliffe appeared as Maria Borrow in the Sky1 television film television film adaptation of the M. C. Beaton novel Agatha Raisin and the Quiche of Death.

In 2022, McAuliffe appeared as Black Eyed Mog, in the BBC production of "The English".

Writing
As well as writing several plays, McAuliffe has published two novels, The Crime Tsar, based loosely on Macbeth; and A Fanny Full of Soap, a comic novel about the pre-West End run of a stage musical, plus a children's story, Attila, Loolagax and the Eagle, both in 2003. She is also an occasional contributor to newspapers such as the Daily Mail. In 2015, her play Maurice's Jubilee was produced in the Moscow Art Theatre under the title The Jeweller's Jubilee and received good reviews.

Personal life
McAuliffe married Don MacKay, a crime reporter for the Daily Mirror, in 1996. He died in 2017.

She is a patron of Saving Faces, the facial surgery research foundation; and of Action for Children's Arts, an organisation dedicated to the promotion of creative arts among children under 12.

References

External links
 
 
Saving Faces: The Facial Surgery Research Foundation

1955 births
21st-century English novelists
Alumni of the London Academy of Music and Dramatic Art
English television actresses
People from Cobham, Surrey
Living people
Laurence Olivier Award winners